Alex Chubrevich (born July 23, 1986) is an Israeli professional basketball player for  Maccabi Haifa of the Israeli Premier League. A Russian-born Jew, he is 2.12 m (6 ft 11.5 in) in height, and weighs .

Early life
Until his senior year in high school Chubrevich played volleyball, before moving to basketball.

Professional career
On September 4, 2017, Chubrevich signed with Maccabi Ashdod for the 2017–18 season, joining his former head coach Brad Greenberg. Chubrevich helped Ashdod reach the 2018 Israeli League Playoffs, where they eventually lost to Hapoel Tel Aviv in the Quarterfinals.

On July 9, 2018, Chubrevich signed a two-year deal with Hapoel Jerusalem. Chubrevich won the 2019 Israeli State Cup with Jerusalem.

On August 26, 2019, Chubrevich signed with Maccabi Rishon LeZion for the 2019–20 season, replacing Ben Altit. On October 31, 2019, he parted ways with Rishon LeZion to join Maccabi Ashdod for a second stint.

See also
List of select Jewish basketball players

References

External links
Israeli League profile

1986 births
Living people
Barak Netanya B.C. players
Centers (basketball)
Israeli men's basketball players
Hapoel Gilboa Galil Elyon players
Hapoel Jerusalem B.C. players
Maccabi Ashdod B.C. players
Maccabi Haifa B.C. players
Maccabi Rishon LeZion basketball players
Jewish men's basketball players
Israeli Jews
Russian Jews